The East Asian Zonal Volleyball Association, is the governing body for the sports of indoor, beach and grass volleyball in East Asia.

In the spirit of the FIVB 2001 Plan, AVC was the first to create five Zonal Associations at the 10th General Assembly in December 1993 prior to the FIVB Centennial Congress in September 1994.

Member associations

Ranking

Men's national teams

Senior team
Rankings are calculated by FIVB.

Last updated 22 August 2016

Women's national teams

Senior team
Rankings are calculated by FIVB.

Last updated 22 August 2016

Executive committee

Competitions

Volleyball

See also 

 Central Asian Volleyball Association
 Oceania Zonal Volleyball Association
 Southeast Asian Volleyball Association

References

External links
  

Sports organizations established in 1993
1993 establishments in Asia
Volleyball in Asia